Baratashvili Bridge (baratashvilis khidi) is a traffic and pedestrian bridge over the Kura River in Tbilisi, capital of Georgia. It was built in 1966 in place of the previously dismantled Mukhrani Bridge honoring Princess Mukhrani.

Design
The bridge, located in Mtasminda district of the city, is often referred to as Bridge of Love, in reference to its current name given in honor of Georgian romanticism poet Nikoloz Baratashvili. The railings of the bridge have been decorated with bronze figures of couples in love. The bridge stretches over Mtkvari River in parallel to the picturesque Bridge of Peace and extends to Tbilisi Airport through a recently renovated highway. The bridge and the highway were renovated by Khidmsheni construction company.

See also
 Bridge of Peace
 Ananuri Bridge
 Ceremonial Palace of Georgia
 Architecture of Georgia

References

Footbridges
Road bridges
Bridges completed in 1966
Tourism in Georgia (country)
Buildings and structures in Tbilisi
Bridges in Georgia (country)
Road bridges in Europe